Nikolay Sergeyevich Morilov (born August 11, 1986 in Perm) is a Russian cross-country skier who has been competing since 2004. He won two medals at the FIS Nordic World Ski Championships with a silver in the team sprint (2007) and a bronze in the individual sprint (2009).

Morilov has two individual victories at the junior level of cross country up to 10 km, both in 2004.

Morilov won bronze with Alexey Petukhov in the Team Sprint at the 2010 Winter Olympics in Vancouver.

Cross-country skiing results
All results are sourced from the International Ski Federation (FIS).

Olympic Games
 1 medal – (1 bronze)

World Championships
 2 medals – (1 silver, 1 bronze)

World Cup

Season standings

Individual podiums
3 victories – (1 , 2 )
7 podiums – (4 , 3 )

Team podiums
4 victories – (4 )
5 podiums – (5 )

References

External links
 
 
 
 

1986 births
Living people
Russian male cross-country skiers
Olympic cross-country skiers of Russia
Olympic bronze medalists for Russia
Olympic medalists in cross-country skiing
Cross-country skiers at the 2010 Winter Olympics
Medalists at the 2010 Winter Olympics
FIS Nordic World Ski Championships medalists in cross-country skiing
Sportspeople from Perm, Russia